Snooker world rankings 2001/2002: The professional world rankings for the top 64 snooker players in the 2001–02 season are listed below.

References

2001
Rankings 2002
Rankings 2001